Tesetaxel is an orally administered taxane being investigated as a chemotherapy agent for various types of cancer, including breast cancer, gastric cancer, colorectal cancer, and other solid tumors. It differs from other members of the taxane class (e.g. paclitaxel or docetaxel) in that it is administered orally, not intravenously.

References 

Mitotic inhibitors
Benzoate esters
Carbamates
Pyridines
Organofluorides
Ketones
Acetate esters
Taxanes
Tert-butyl compounds